Barons Court is a London Underground station in West Kensington in the London Borough of Hammersmith and Fulham, Greater London. This station serves the District line and the Piccadilly line. Barons Court is between West Kensington and Hammersmith on the District line, and between Earl's Court and Hammersmith on the Piccadilly line and is in Travelcard Zone 2. East of the station, the Piccadilly line descends into tunnel towards Earl's Court and the District line continues in a cutting to West Kensington. The station is the last open air stop for eastbound trains on the Piccadilly line until Arnos Grove and has cross-platform interchange with the District line.

Location
The station is located on Gliddon Road, a short distance from Talgarth Road (A4). East of the station, the Piccadilly line descends into tunnel towards Earl's Court and the District line continues on the surface to West Kensington. West of the station, both Piccadilly line and District line continue to Hammersmith station. The station is located in a deep, brick sided cutting.

History

The tracks through Barons Court were first laid on 9 September 1874 when the District Railway (DR, now the District line) opened an extension from Earl's Court to Hammersmith. When the line was constructed the area now known as "Barons Court" was open fields and market gardens to the west of the hamlet of North End and there was no call for a station between North End, Fulham and Hammersmith stations.

However, by the beginning of the 20th century, the area had been developed for housing and, on 9 October 1905, the District Railway (DR) opened a station to serve these new developments and in preparation for the opening of the Great Northern, Piccadilly and Brompton Railway (GNP&BR, now the Piccadilly line), then under construction. The GNP&BR began operations on 15 December 1906, running between Hammersmith and Finsbury Park.

In the 1990s, the Grade II listed station was carefully restored to its original appearance.

Notable fatality
The former Formula One driver B. Bira, who was a member of the Thai Royal family, was found dead at the station on 23 December 1985.

The station today
The station building was constructed to a design by Harry Ford in a style similar to that used at Earl's Court and Hammersmith and is now a Grade II listed building as it retains many of its original features, including terracotta facing and Art Nouveau lettering. The wooden benches on the platform with the station name along the back on enamelled metal panels are a unique feature on the entire London Underground. The station has two island platforms to provide an interchange between the two lines - the inner pair of tracks is used by the Piccadilly line and the outer tracks by the District line. The station building has been Grade II listed since 14 February 1985.

Name
The name Barons Court is possibly inspired by the Baronscourt estate in Co Tyrone, Northern Ireland, where Sir William Palliser, who built part of the area, may have had connections. Unlike Earl's Court station, Barons Court is written without an apostrophe.

Services

District line
The typical off-peak service in trains per hour (tph) is:
12tph eastbound to Upminster (6tph to Barking on Sundays)
6tph westbound to Ealing Broadway
6tph westbound to Richmond

There is also a morning service every day from Acton Town (Ealing Broadway on Saturdays) to Edgware Road and a late evening service from Edgware Road to Ealing Broadway on Sundays only.

Piccadilly line
The typical off-peak service in trains per hour (tph) is as follows:
18 tph eastbound to Cockfosters
3 tph eastbound to Arnos Grove
6 tph westbound to Heathrow Terminals 2 & 3 and 5
6 tph westbound to Heathrow Terminals 4 and 2 & 3
3 tph westbound to Northfields
3 tph westbound to Rayners Lane
3 tph westbound to Uxbridge

Nearby places
Ealing, Hammersmith and West London College's Hammersmith site is across Talgarth Road on Gliddon Road.
The Queen's Club, location of the Aegon Championships tennis tournament, is at the end of Palliser Road.
The London Academy of Music and Dramatic Art, (LAMDA), is on the Talgarth Road.
Margravine Cemetery
Charing Cross Hospital is nearby, and is advertised at the station exit.

References

External links

  
  In the distance can be seen the Great Ferris wheel at Earl's Court exhibition ground.
 
 
 

District line stations
Piccadilly line stations
London Underground Night Tube stations
Tube stations in the London Borough of Hammersmith and Fulham
Grade II listed buildings in the London Borough of Hammersmith and Fulham
Grade II listed railway stations
Former Metropolitan District Railway stations
Railway stations in Great Britain opened in 1905
Former Great Northern, Piccadilly and Brompton Railway stations
Railway stations in Great Britain opened in 1906
Railway stations with vitreous enamel panels
Art Nouveau architecture in London
Art Nouveau railway stations
West Kensington
Fulham